The Dhaka Christian Cemetery (also known as the Narinda Cemetery) is a graveyard situated in Wari, a district of the old town in Dhaka, Bangladesh. It was established by Portuguese traders in the 17th century and is still in use by members of the Dhaka Christian community. It contains two designated archeological sites, the Columbo Sahib mausoleum and the tomb of Reverend Joseph Paget. Many of the oldest graves and mausoleums are in a state of disrepair and are being overtaken by unchecked vegetation growth and lack of maintenance, while other parts of the cemetery still see new burials taking place at regular intervals. It is open to visitors on a daily basis.

Origins
Dhaka's first church for the Christian community was established on this site. It is recorded that priest Sebastian Manrique came to Dhaka between 1624 and 1629 and recorded a church at the location of the cemetery. There are further references to a church being located at this location and this is mentioned in the accounts of many other priests and tourists. French gem merchant and traveler Jean Baptiste Tavernier visited Dhaka in 1666 and Niccolò Menucci soon after, with both referring to a church at this location. It is assumed that Portuguese Augustinians built the church, and that the present burial ground was originally the burial ground adjacent to the church, commonly referred to as the "church graveyard."

At the time when the church was established, other European ethnic groups started living in Dhaka. In 1632 ethnic conflict peaked between the Portuguese and other nationalities and most Portuguese settlers, traders and priests were ousted on the orders of Emperor Shah Jahan and they fled to Hooghly. Dhaka locals declared solidarity with the emperor and beat the parish priest, Father Bernardo, to death. It is believed that he is also buried in the cemetery.

A list of Augustinian churches established in Bengal was drawn up in 1789 but the Narinda church was not listed. It is assumed that the church was destroyed sometime between 1713 and 1789, but the cemetery remained in use.

Architectural significance

Two structures have been designated as protected archeological sites by the Bangladesh Department of Archaeology: the early-18th-century mausoleum of Columbo Sahib and the 1774 tomb of Reverend Joseph Paget. The cemetery has six type of tombs in the complex:

Type A
These graves are either really old, and no structure or inscriptions remains; or completely new, such that even the originality of the position of the grave and the inscription can be questioned as the frequent interaction taking place in the monument can be noted to any visitors.

Type B
The Moorish-type gateway was built during the Mughal period using thin 'jafri bricks' (these are clearly visible where the plaster has fallen off in parts). The gate would previously have led into a specific section of the graveyard, but today its location and purpose are more obscure. Its position also reveals that no formal layout was maintained in the expansion of the cemetery.

Type C, D and E
The obelisk and urn resemble the contemporary best-known English cemeteries in Calcutta; the Baroque character of the older and provincial cemeteries. The Indian version of the pyramid stands on a podium where the inscriptions are laid, has a less broad base, which is smoothly uplifted to an acute angled apex.

Type F: The Columbo Sahib mausoleum

The largest structure in the cemetery is a mausoleum containing three graves, all without any inscription. The lower part of the mausoleum resembles a Mughal mosque with four evenly spaced, arched doorways – one on each side of the structure. The next level is constructed with prominent gothic features while the cupola is based on baroque style architecture. A painting of the mausoleum was completed by the German artist Johann Zoffany in 1786, titled "Nagaphon Ghat" (translated from Bengali it means the Nagaphon mooring or dock), depicting the structure on the Dolai Khal or creek, that has since been filled back and no longer reaches as far as the cemetery.

The first time the structure was referred to as "the Columbo Sahib mausoleum" was by Reginald Heber, the Bishop of Calcutta, in an essay entitled, 'Narrative of a journey through the Upper Provinces of India, from Calcutta to Bombay, 1824–25, with an account of a journey to Madras and the Southern Provinces' which was published after his death by his wife Amelia Heber in 1828. Heber had consecrated the Narinda cemetery in 1824, and it was during this visit that he noticed the large imposing, but unidentified tomb. He records that he enquired of the gatekeeper as to who it belonged to and was told "It's the tomb of Columbo Sahib, an employee of the East India Company." Herber recorded this but was unable to identify the identity of Columbo Sahib or Colombo Sahib. Today there is no mention of Columbo Sahib in any preserved early Persian, Urdu, Bengali or English chronicles.

Archaeologist Tim Steel later recorded Columbo Sahib as a merchant who came to Dhaka from Colombo, Ceylon, to trade and subsequently prospered and became famously known in Dhaka as Columbo Sahib. There is also an opinion that Columbo could have been a Portuguese or Sri Lankan Sinhalese Christian who came to Dhaka from Colombo. He could also have been a local Luso-Portuguese gentleman from the Indian subcontinent. The Portuguese connection is also reinforced by Charles Greig speculating that Columbo was Portuguese. Grieg speculates that the Columbo mausoleum was built circa 1670–80 during the time of a very strong presence of Portuguese traders in Dhaka.

Francis Bradley Bradley-Birt (1874–1963) was a British civil servant and writer. In his book titled 'The Romance of an Eastern Capital', written in 1906, he described the Columbo Sahib mausoleum as ....It stands namelessly, dominating the whole cemetery, and jealously keeping watch over the three graves that lie within.

The Dhaka Department of Archaeology has declared the Columbo Sahib mausoleum one of Dhaka city's 22 heritage sites. This has however not stopped the decay and crumbling of the structure.

Present condition

The cemetery had been in a declining state since the early 1800s as noticed by both Reginald Heber and F. B. Bradley burt, although the decay had a more emotional romantic appeal to him. The original road layout of the cemetery has faded away with time, but it can be understood that a couple of straight roads intersected to make a path system within the network. The tombs were jumbled into a group to form one or two clusters, while making it hardly visible to visitors.

Notable interments
 Joseph Padget, Padre from Calcutta
 Colombo Sahib
 The double tombs of Robert Wigram Craufurd (the factor of the East India Company) and his wife, dated 1776, located in the original southern section of the cemetery
 Wonsi Quan of 1796, a Chinese convert to Christianity
 There is a monument to two soldiers killed in the Sepoy Mutiny of 1857 (to the left of the entrance first grave on the path). Other graves hold Henry Smith who died on 22 November 1857, the day of the Rebellion and that of soldiers Neil McMullen and James Moores who died on 23 November 1857. William Esden and Robert Brown were also victims of the mutiny and died on 24 November 1857.
 Jane Rennell – daughter of James Rennell
 Elizabeth David: 18 November 1878, wife of Marcar David, the "Merchant Prince of Bengal." The grave has an exquisite statue of Madonna, reflecting the wealth her family.
 Joakim G. Nicholas Pogose: 1876. Founder of Pogoz School (first private school in Dhaka, established in 1848). He became director of Dhaka Bank established in 1846 and in 1874, Commissioner of Dhaka Municipality.
 Maj. Gen. Hamilton Vetch: 1865. Maj. Gen. of the Bengal Army. He contributed significantly to the jungle war in Assam.
 Flt. Lt. Edward N. Owens – pilot of a RAF Gloster Javelin jet aircraft that crashed over the Meghna River on 5 August 1961.

Gallery

References

 Asiatic Society Of Bangladesh. Dhaka( p. 58).

Cemeteries in Bangladesh
Old Dhaka
History of Dhaka
Armenian cemeteries
Tourist attractions in Dhaka